Indiana University of Pennsylvania (IUP) is a public research university in Indiana, Pennsylvania. As of fall 2021, the university enrolled 7,044 undergraduates and 1,865 postgraduates, for a total enrollment of 9,009 students. It is governed by a local Council of Trustees and the Board of Governors of the Pennsylvania State System of Higher Education. IUP has branch campuses at Punxsutawney, Northpointe, and Monroeville. IUP is accredited by the Middle States Commission on Higher Education.

History
IUP was conceived as Indiana Normal School, first chartered in 1871 by Indiana County investors. The school was created under the Normal School Act, which passed the Pennsylvania General Assembly on May 20, 1875. Normal schools established under the act were to be private corporations in no way dependent upon the state treasury. They were to be "state" normal schools only in the sense of being officially recognized by the commonwealth.

The school opened its doors in 1875 following the mold of the French École Normale. It enrolled just 225 students. All normal school events were held within a single building which also contained a laboratory school for model teaching. Control and ownership of the institution passed to the Commonwealth of Pennsylvania in 1920.  In 1927, by authority of the Pennsylvania General Assembly, it became State Teachers College at Indiana, with the right to grant degrees.  As its mission expanded, the name was changed in 1959 to Indiana State College. In 1965, the institution achieved university status and became Indiana University of Pennsylvania, or IUP.

2013-present 

IUP total enrollment peaked in the Fall of 2012 at 15,379 and has declined steadily since. This enrollment decline caused financial difficulties for the university which struggled to cover costs for its 2010 dormitory expansion. In October 2020, IUP President Michael Driscoll announced restructuring and retrenchment plans related to leadership's NextGen proposal. Retrenchment or lay-off notices were issued to 81 tenured or tenure-track faculty on October 30, 2020, with another 47 expected before the end of the academic year. Fall 2021 enrollment was 9,009. In the fall of 2022, enrollment was 8,832.

Academics
IUP offers over 140 undergraduate degree programs, over 70 minors, over 35 certificate programs and 70 graduate degree programs under the direction of eight colleges and schools:
Eberly College of Business 
College of Education and Communications
College of Health and Human Services
School of Graduate Studies and Research
College of Arts and Humanities
College of Natural Sciences and Mathematics
University College

Robert E. Cook Honors College was founded to offer a seminar style, discourse-based liberal studies curriculum.

Accolades
IUP faculty has won nearly 60 Fulbright Exchange Awards since 1959, enabling them to study and conduct research in 27 countries. Two faculty members have been awarded the Rome Prize.

IUP students have earned accolades including: Fulbright Scholar, Phi Kappa Phi grants, Barry M. Goldwater Scholar, Ronald E. McNair Scholar, Gilman Scholar, Finnegan Fellow, and the PaSSHE Ali-Zaidi award.

The Penn 
Founded in 1924, The Penn is IUP student body's official newspaper. It has won 3 Student Keystone Media Awards in 2018 and one nomination in 2019.

Rankings 
The 2020 Washington Monthly College Rankings of National Universities ranks IUP 193rd out of 388 schools.

Campus

IUP's  main campus is a mix of 62 old and new red brick structures.  Its original building, a Victorian structure named John Sutton Hall once housed the entire school. Today Sutton Hall is listed on the National Register of Historic Places. It stands at the heart of campus—there was a fight to preserve it in 1974 when the administration scheduled it for demolition. Ironically, today it houses many administrative offices and reception areas. Breezedale Alumni Center is also listed on the National Register of Historic Places.  The Victorian mansion was once home to a Pennsylvania Supreme Court Justice.

The campus boasts a planetarium, University Museum, black box theater, Hadley Union Building (HUB), extensive music library, and a newly remodeled Cogswell Hall for the university's music community. Stapleton Library boasts 900,000-plus bound volumes and over 2 million microform units. At the heart of campus is the Oak Grove. Many alumni recall this spot because of its centrality and the many events that occur there.  In January 2000 former President Lawrence K. Pettit established a board to create the Allegheny Arboretum at IUP. This group works to furnish the Oak Grove with flora native to the region. The university also operates an academy of Culinary Arts in Punxsutawney and a police academy at its main campus.

The university's Student Cooperative Association also owns College Lodge several miles from campus. It provides skiing, biking, hiking, and disc golfing opportunities.  Boat access is also made available through the Cooperative Association.

Over the last five years, IUP has demolished most of the 1970 era dormitories on campus. Demolition began during summer 2006 and facilities are being replaced with modern suites. Construction is ongoing with seven new dormitories completed for Fall 2009. Two more suite-style buildings were completed by Fall 2010. That semester, the ribbon cutting ceremony at Stephenson Hall was considered to have finished the four-year-long "residence hall revival". These suite-style rooms are similar to those being built at other universities in PASSHE.

Greek organizations

Fraternities
Fraternities at IUP:

 Acacia
 Alpha Chi Sigma (Professional Chemistry Fraternity)
 Alpha Delta
 Alpha Phi Alpha
 Alpha Phi Omega (National Community Service Fraternity) (Inactive since 2017)
 Alpha Tau Delta (National Nursing Fraternity)
 Delta Omicron (Music)
 Delta Sigma Phi
 Delta Tau Delta
 Kappa Alpha Psi
 Kappa Delta Rho
 Kappa Sigma
 Iota Phi Theta 
 IUPXC
 Men of God Christian Fraternity (MOG)
 Omega Psi Phi
 Phi Beta Sigma
 Phi Kappa Psi
 Phi Kappa Tau
 Phi Mu Alpha (Music)
 Phi Delta Theta
 Phi Mu Delta
 Phi Sigma Kappa
 Pi Lambda Phi
 Pi Kappa Phi
 Rho Tau Chi (Military/Community Service)
 Sigma Alpha Iota (Music)
 Sigma Alpha Lambda (Honor Organization, Community Service)
 Sigma Chi
 Sigma Pi
 Sigma Tau Gamma
 Theta Chi
 Phi Gamma Nu (Business)
 Alpha Kappa Delta (Sociology)

Sororities

 Alpha Gamma Delta
 Alpha Sigma Alpha
 Alpha Sigma Tau
 Alpha Xi Delta
 Delta Gamma
 Delta Phi Epsilon
 Delta Zeta
 Gamma Sigma Sigma (Service)
 Sigma Kappa
 Sigma Sigma Sigma
 Sigma Alpha Iota (Music)
 Theta Phi Alpha
 Zeta Tau Alpha

Honor Fraternities
 Phi Sigma Pi (Gender-inclusive National Honor Fraternity)
 Alpha Psi Omega (Theater)

Honor Societies

 Gamma Theta Upsilon (Geography)
 Lambda Alpha (Anthropology)
 Phi Kappa Phi (All-discipline Honor Society)
 Rho Sigma Kappa (Safety Sciences Honor Society)
 Beta Gamma Sigma (Business)
 Kappa Delta Pi (Education)
 National Society of Leadership and Success
 Golden Key International
 Alpha Kappa Delta (Sociology)
 Psi Chi (Psychology)
 Alpha Phi Sigma (Criminology)
 Phi Alpha Theta (History)

Athletics

IUP's athletic department sponsors 19 varsity sports, including 8 for men and 11 for women. There are also club sports teams such as ice hockey and rugby. The Crimson Hawks, formerly known as the Indians, compete in the Pennsylvania State Athletic Conference (PSAC) of NCAA Division II.

IUP annually produces teams and individuals that compete for championships on the conference, regional and national levels. The 2004–05 school year saw 12 sports either send their teams or individuals to NCAA postseason competition.

The IUP football team has been to the NCAA Division II national title game twice (1990 and 1993). In both cases, IUP came up short, finishing the season as runner-up. While Division II teams rarely appear on television, IUP has appeared on regional telecasts in 1968 at the Boardwalk Bowl and 2006 against California University of PA. The team has also been on national TV while playing in those Division II national title games from 1990 and 1993. On November 2, 2006, a game against Slippery Rock was nationally televised on the TV channel, CSTV. Additionally, on September 15, 2011, a game against Bloomsburg was nationally televised on the TV channel CBS Sports Network as the NCAA Division II game of the week.

The IUP men's basketball team likewise lost the NCAA Division II national title game twice in 2010 and 2015.

The IUP rugby team finished 3rd in the Division I national championship in 2000, finishing behind California and Wyoming and ahead of fourth-place Army.

The IUP Men's Ice Hockey (ACHA Division 1) team won the CHMA season championship in 2018–2019, the CHMA playoff in 2019-2020 awarded a bid to the ACHA National Tournament as the 19th seed, but the tournament was canceled due to the COVID-19 pandemic.  In the 2022-2023 season, IUP Men's Ice Hockey won the CHMA season and playoff championship and awarded a bid to the ACHA National Tournament as the 18th seed.  Team captain Dominick Glavach was awarded the 2023 CHMA playoff MVP award and Head Coach Joe Honzo was awarded the CHMA Coach of the year. 

The IUP Men's Lacrosse Team were the 2018 and 2019 Three Rivers Conference Champions and are currently ranked number 13 in the nation in division two by the NCLL for the 2020 season.

People

Gawdat Bahgat; political scientist, author, professor
Duncan Black ("Atrios"); blogger
Nellie Bly (1879); journalist
Tim Burns (1990); businessman, politician
Mark Critz (1987); United States House of Representatives (2010–2012)
Dana D. Nelson (1984); literature professor, author, advocate for citizenship and democracy
John Stuchell Fisher (1886); Governor of Pennsylvania (1927–1931)
Chad Hurley (1999); Co-founder and CEO, YouTube
Summers Melville Jack; United States House of Representatives (1899–1903)
Matthew Knisely; photojournalist
John Murtha; United States House of Representatives (1974–2010)
Farah Quinn; Indonesian celebrity chef
Patricia Robertson (1985); NASA Astronaut
Art Rooney (1920); founder of the Pittsburgh Steelers
Jimmy Stewart (Keith Laboratory School); actor
Jack Wagner (1974); Pittsburgh City Council (1984–1994), Pennsylvania Senate (1994–2005), Pennsylvania Auditor General (2005–2013)
Jim Haslett (1979); National Football League player (Buffalo Bills) and coach (New Orleans Saints, St. Louis Rams); member of the College Football Hall of Fame
Steve Wolfe (Johnny Sins); male adult film star

References

Further reading
Juliette, Ron and Dale E. Landon. Our Homage and Our Love, 1991.
Merriman, John Edward. The Indiana Story 1875–1975: Pennsylvania's First State University... 1976.
Stewart, Grace. A History of the Indiana State Normal School.

External links

IUP athletics website

 
1875 establishments in Pennsylvania
Educational institutions established in 1875
Universities and colleges in Indiana County, Pennsylvania
Pennsylvania State System of Higher Education
Public universities and colleges in Pennsylvania
Cooking schools in the United States
Indiana, Pennsylvania